Joyce Rofin Julius (born 1 September 1949) is a Pakistani politician  who was a Member of the Provincial Assembly of the Punjab, from 2002 to May 2018.

Early life 
She was born on 1 September 1949.

Political career
She was elected to the Provincial Assembly of the Punjab as a candidate of Pakistan Muslim League (Q) (PML-Q) on a reserved seat for minority in 2002 Pakistani general election. She served as Provincial Minister of Punjab for Minorities’ Affairs from 2003 to 2007.

She was re-elected to the Provincial Assembly of the Punjab as a candidate of PML-Q on a reserved seat for minority in 2008 Pakistani general election.

She was re-elected to the Provincial Assembly of the Punjab as a candidate of Pakistan Muslim League (N) on a reserved seat for women in 2013 Pakistani general election.

In December 2013, he was appointed as Parliamentary Secretary for school education.

References

1949 births
Living people
Women members of the Provincial Assembly of the Punjab
Punjab MPAs 2013–2018
Pakistan Muslim League (N) MPAs (Punjab)
Punjab MPAs 2008–2013
Punjab MPAs 2002–2007
Punjab MPAs 2018–2023
21st-century Pakistani women politicians